Wollongong, an electoral district of the Legislative Assembly in the Australian state of New South Wales, has had three incarnations, the first from 1904 to 1920, the second from 1927 to 1930, and the third from 1968 to the present.


Members

Election results

Elections in the 2010s

2019

2016 by-election

2015

2011

Elections in the 2000s

2007

2003

Elections in the 1990s

1999

1995

1991

Elections in the 1980s

1988

1984

1981

Elections in the 1970s

1978

1976

1973

1971

Elections in the 1960s

1968

1927 - 1968
District abolished

Elections in the 1920s

1927

1920 - 1927
District abolished

Elections in the 1910s

1917

1913

1910

Elections in the 1900s

1907

1904

References

New South Wales state electoral results by district